Pavel Parasca (born July 8, 1939) is a historian from the Republic of Moldova.

Biography 
Pavel Parasca was born on July 8, 1939 in Brînzenii Vechi and graduated from the Moldova State University in 1967. Then he worked as redactor for "Enciclopedia RSS Moldovenesti" and teacher in Congo-Brazzaville (1967–1968, 1971–1972). He returned for good in Chişinău, where he had academic positions in the Facultatea de Istorie of Moldova State University, Institutul de Istorie of Academy of Sciences of Moldova, Facultatea de Stiinte Umanistice a ULIM. On June 18, 1989, Parasca Pavel Fiodorovici was a founder of the Association of Historians of Moldova; he was director of the association for four years. 

Pavel Parasca is a member of the Commission for the Study of the Communist Dictatorship in Moldova. The commission was instituted by the President of Moldova Mihai Ghimpu to investigate the Communist regime and provide a comprehensive report.

Works
 Pavel Parasca, La obarsia Mitropoliei Tarii Moldovei, Chişinău: Prut International, 2002.

References

External links 
 Pavel Parasca, dr. habilitat in istorie, profesor universitar
 Pavel Parasca
 Preşedintele interimar al Republicii Moldova Mihai Ghimpu a emis un decret prezidenţial privind constituirea Comisiei pentru studierea şi aprecierea regimului comunist totalitar din Republica Moldova.
Moldovan authorities going to condemn communist regime…
Hundreds of thousands of cases to be examined by commission for combating Communism 
 http://www.privesc.eu/?p=1884 - The first press conference of the Commission, Moldpress, January 18, 2010. Video.
 https://web.archive.org/web/20100309165120/http://www.timpul.md/article/2010/01/18/5881 - interview with Gheorghe Cojocaru, president of the Commission.
 Vladimir Tismăneanu, Un moment istoric: Comisia de studiere a comunismului
 Site-ul Parlamentului Republicii Moldova

1939 births
People from Telenești District
Living people
Moldova State University alumni
20th-century Moldovan historians
Members of the Commission for the Study of the Communist Dictatorship in Moldova
21st-century Moldovan historians